Heiko Gigler (born 17 June 1996) is an Austrian swimmer. He competed in the men's 50 metre butterfly event at the 2018 FINA World Swimming Championships (25 m), in Hangzhou, China. Gigler competed for Austria at the 2020 Summer Olympics in Tokyo, in the Men's 50 metre freestyle event, but did not advance from the preliminary round.

References

External links
 

1996 births
Living people
Austrian male freestyle swimmers
Austrian male butterfly swimmers
Place of birth missing (living people)
Swimmers at the 2020 Summer Olympics
Olympic swimmers of Austria
Competitors at the 2019 Summer Universiade
20th-century Austrian people
21st-century Austrian people
European Aquatics Championships medalists in swimming